Test Drive 6 is a racing video game developed by Pitbull Syndicate for PlayStation, Microsoft Windows and Dreamcast. In the United States the game was published by Infogrames North America, while in Europe the game was published by Cryo Interactive. The game featured 37 licensed cars, plus four police car variants. As a first for the series, cars from General Motors are not playable in this game, instead they appear as traffic cars. The soundtrack featured industrial rock and techno music from artists such as Fear Factory, Lunatic Calm and Cirrus.

A Game Boy Color version was developed by Xantera, a small developer that also developed other Test Drive titles for the handheld.

As of 2019, the PC version of the game has compatibility issues preventing it from being played properly on modern computers. The game's soundtrack no longer plays due to the removal of Windows' CD audio compatibility for games. The installer does not work on Windows Vista and newer, necessitating a drag-and-drop install. Use of the dgvoodoo wrapper allows the game to be played somewhat accurately on newer systems, though music is still missing.

Gameplay 
Test Drive 6 is an arcade racing game similar to previous titles in the series. The game features Single Race, "Race Menu" (career) mode and a splitscreen multiplayer mode.

Single race allows players to choose a car and track and play it without any of the requirements or repercussions of career mode. Likewise, this mode has a small selection of cars from all classes available even if the player has not unlocked or purchased them in Race Menu.

The Race Menu career mode allows the player to purchase a vehicle from the Tier 1 dealership and provides them with tournaments to race in, limited by tier. The player wagers in-game currency on each race in the tournament and can receive an extra bonus payout for overall finishing position. Tournaments increase in length, difficulty and payout amounts by tier. The mode also features Stop The Racers and Stop The Bomber modes wherein the player drives a police car in pursuits.

Game Boy version 
Test Drive 6 was released on a black cartridge for the Game Boy and Game Boy Color. The handheld version of the game is a RC Pro Am clone. It features a limited selection of licensed vehicles from the main game and tracks named after real world cities. A sequel was released exclusively for the Game Boy Color in 2000, called Test Drive 2001.

Reception 

Test Drive 6 received "mixed" reviews on all platforms except the PC version, which received "unfavourable" reviews, according to the review aggregation website GameRankings.

The writers of IGN gave many different opinions to each of the game's system releases. First, David Zdyrko said of the PlayStation version: "After six tries, they still haven't gotten it right". Arun Devidas said of the PC version: "It's not the best racer in town, but Test Drive 6 still has a few redeeming qualities". Craig Harris said of the Game Boy Color version: "Cruising along city streets in real cars should be more fun than this Game Boy racing title". Matt White said of the Dreamcast version: "Infogrames struts their stuff, showing us that they have what it takes to slaughter an innocent game". Nick McElveen of Computer Games Strategy Plus gave the PC version two-and-a-half stars out of five, saying, "While it is not as good as the last two Need for Speeds, Test Drive 6 nevertheless succeeds to some extent at being an enjoyable arcade-style driving game that gets the heart racing, so to speak."

Matt Sammons of NextGen said of the same Dreamcast version: "This strange mix of bumper cars and sports cars is stunningly mediocre. Test before driving."

References

External links

6
1999 video games
Accolade (company) games
Cryo Interactive games
Dreamcast games
Game Boy Color games
Infogrames games
Multiplayer and single-player video games
PlayStation (console) games
Video games about police officers
Video games developed in the United Kingdom
Video games set in Hong Kong
Video games set in London
Video games set in Newcastle upon Tyne
Video games set in New York City
Video games set in Paris
Video games set in Egypt
Video games set in Ireland
Video games set in Switzerland
Video games set in Rome
Windows games
Xantera games